The Fading Light is a 2009 film directed by Ivan Kavanagh which won Best Irish Film and Best Actor at the Jameson Dublin International Film Festival 2010.

The cast includes Valene Kane, Emma Eliza Regan, Bibi Larrson and Patrick O’Donnell who won the Best Actor gong from the Dublin Film Critics Circle for his performance in the film

The film has a limited release at Dublin's IFI from 12 March 2010

References

External links 
 

2009 films
English-language Irish films
2000s English-language films